Mount Trickett, a mountain on the Great Dividing Range, is located approximately  west of Jenolan Caves, in the Central Tablelands region of New South Wales, Australia.

The true location of Mount Trickett is approximately  further west along Edith Road.

Features
Snowfalls are relatively common on Mount Trickett from autumn through to spring with perhaps ten to fifteen falls per season. Five or six of these snowfalls are typically heavy enough to close the roads near the summit. Icy roads during the colder months can also make travel in the area hazardous although it is usually navigable by 2WD vehicles. Particularly strong cold outbreaks make an approach from the Jenolan Caves side quite risky and the Oberon road is preferred. There is a nondescript gravel turnoff that leads you to a brick building at the summit with a sign that says "Navigational Facility". As with nearby Mount Bindo and Shooters Hill, this is a common spot for 'snow chasers' to look for snow when coming in from Sydney and the Blue Mountains.

There are no survey control marks (including trigonometrical stations) located at the summit of Mount Trickett.

Etymology
Mount Trickett may well have been named after Oliver Trickett L.S. M.S., as he was the licensed surveyor, mapper and modeller of the Jenolan Caves over twenty years in the late 1800s to early 1900s, (along with surveying and mapping most other major limestone caves in NSW, and surveying, mapping and modelling the mining loads of NSW, chief being the Broken Hill silver, lead and zinc load). This work was conducted whilst in the employ as Surveyor for the NSW Department of Lands and Mining Surveyor for the NSW Department of Mines. He became the chief superintendent of Jenolan Caves in terms of overseeing all access improvements at Jenolan in the early 1900s.

See also
 
List of mountains in New South Wales

References

External links
 Relief maps of the area – Provided by NSW Central Ranges Weather – see link below
 NSW Central Ranges Weather – Local site with weather information and maps etc. for the Oberon Plateau area
 Blackheath Weather – Another site with snow and general weather information for the area

Trickett, Mount
Trickett, Mount
Trickett
Oberon Council